The following lists events that happened in 1938 in Iceland.

Incumbents
Monarch - Kristján X
Prime Minister – Hermann Jónasson

Events

Births
6 January – Garðar Árnason, footballer
15 March – Þorsteinn frá Hamri, writer (d. 2018)
18 March – Álfrún Gunnlaugsdóttir, writer
23 June – Hjalti Einarsson, handball player.
27 June – Björgvin Hermannsson, footballer (d. 2012)
24 August – Halldór Blöndal, politician.
21 September  – Atli Heimir Sveinsson, composer (d. 2019)

Deaths
21 May – Einar Hjörleifsson Kvaran, editor, novelist, poet and playwright (b. 1859)

References

 
1930s in Iceland
Iceland
Iceland
Years of the 20th century in Iceland